Angraecum ramosum is a small, caulescent species of orchid, native to Mauritius and Réunion.

ramosum
Orchids of Mauritius